Herbert Charles Symes (22 August 1892 – June 1977) was an English professional football left back who appeared in the Football League for Aberdare Athletic, Queens Park Rangers and Fulham.

Career statistics

References

1892 births
English footballers
Footballers from Fulham
English Football League players
Association football fullbacks
Fulham F.C. players
Aberdare Athletic F.C. players
Queens Park Rangers F.C. players
Grays Thurrock United F.C. players
Southern Football League players
1977 deaths
Margate F.C. players